Obsessive–compulsive disorder (OCD) is a mental and behavioral disorder in which an individual has intrusive thoughts (an obsession) and feels the need to perform certain routines (compulsions) repeatedly to relieve the distress caused by the obsession, to the extent where it impairs general function. Obsessions are persistent unwanted thoughts, mental images, or urges that generate feelings of anxiety, disgust, or discomfort. Common obsessions include fear of contamination, obsession with symmetry, the fear of acting blasphemously, their own sexual orientation, and the fear of possibly harming others or themselves. Compulsions are repeated actions or routines that occur in response to obsessions to achieve a relief from anxiety. Common compulsions include excessive hand washing, cleaning, counting, ordering, avoiding triggers, hoarding, neutralizing, seeking assurance, praying, and checking things. People with OCD may only perform mental compulsions, this is called primarily obsessional obsessive–compulsive disorder (Pure O). Many adults with OCD are aware that their compulsions do not make sense, but they perform them anyway to relieve the distress caused by obsessions. Compulsions occur often, typically taking up at least one hour per day and impairing one's quality of life.

The cause of OCD is unknown. There appear to be some genetic components, and it is more likely for both identical twins to be affected than both fraternal twins. Risk factors include a history of child abuse or other stress-inducing events; some cases have occurred after streptococcal infections. Diagnosis is based on presented symptoms and requires ruling out other drug-related or medical causes; rating scales such as the Yale–Brown Obsessive Compulsive Scale (Y-BOCS) assess severity. Other disorders with similar symptoms include generalized anxiety disorder, major depressive disorder, eating disorders, tic disorders, and obsessive–compulsive personality disorder. The condition is also associated with a general increase in suicidality.

Treatment for OCD may involve psychotherapy such as cognitive behavioral therapy (CBT), pharmacotherapy such as antidepressants, or surgical procedures such as deep brain stimulation. CBT increases exposure to obsessions and prevents compulsions, while metacognitive therapy encourages ritual behaviors to alter the relationship to one's thoughts about them. Selective serotonin reuptake inhibitors (SSRIs) are a common antidepressant used to treat OCD. SSRIs are more effective when used in excess of the recommended depression dosage; however, higher doses can increase side effect intensity. Commonly used SSRIs include sertraline, fluoxetine, fluvoxamine, paroxetine, citalopram, and escitalopram. Some patients fail to improve after taking the maximum tolerated dose of multiple SSRIs for at least two months; these cases qualify as treatment-resistant and require second-line treatment such as clomipramine or atypical antipsychotic augmentation. Surgery may be used as a final resort in the most severe or treatment-resistant cases, though most procedures are considered experimental due to the limited literature on their side effects. Without treatment, OCD often lasts decades.

Obsessive–compulsive disorder affects about 2.3% of people at some point in their lives, while rates during any given year are about 1.2%. It is unusual for symptoms to begin after age 35, and around 50% of patients experience detrimental effects to daily life before age 20. Males and females are affected equally, and OCD occurs worldwide. The phrase obsessive–compulsive is sometimes used in an informal manner unrelated to OCD to describe someone as excessively meticulous, perfectionistic, absorbed, or otherwise fixated. However, the actual disorder is not characterized by that, and many individuals with OCD may be dirty, unclean, or uncaring about disease/symmetry.

Signs and symptoms 
OCD can present with a wide variety of symptoms. Certain groups of symptoms usually occur together; these groups are sometimes viewed as dimensions, or clusters, which may reflect an underlying process. The standard assessment tool for OCD, the Yale–Brown Obsessive Compulsive Scale (Y-BOCS), has 13 predefined categories of symptoms. These symptoms fit into three to five groupings. A meta-analytic review of symptom structures found a four-factor grouping structure to be most reliable: a symmetry factor, a forbidden thoughts factor, a cleaning factor, and a hoarding factor. The symmetry factor correlates highly with obsessions related to ordering, counting, and symmetry, as well as repeating compulsions. The forbidden thoughts factor correlates highly with intrusive thoughts of a violent, religious, or sexual nature. The cleaning factor correlates highly with obsessions about contamination and compulsions related to cleaning. The hoarding factor only involves hoarding-related obsessions and compulsions, and was identified as being distinct from other symptom groupings.

When looking into the onset of OCD, one study suggests that there are differences in the age of onset between males and females. In children, a study found the average age of onset of OCD to be 9.6 for male children and 11.0 for female children. When looking at both adults and children a study found the average ages of onset to be 21 and 24 for males and females respectively. Looking at women specifically, a different study suggested that 62% of participants found that their symptoms worsened at a premenstrual age. Across the board, all demographics and studies showed a mean age of onset of less than 25.

Some OCD subtypes have been associated with improvement in performance on certain tasks, such as pattern recognition (washing subtype) and spatial working memory (obsessive thought subtype). Subgroups have also been distinguished by neuroimaging findings and treatment response, though neuroimaging studies have not been comprehensive enough to draw conclusions. Subtype-dependent treatment response has been studied, and the hoarding subtype has consistently been least responsive to treatment.

While OCD is considered a homogeneous disorder from a neuropsychological perspective, many of the symptoms may be the result of comorbid disorders. For example, adults with OCD have exhibited more symptoms of attention–deficit/hyperactivity disorder (ADHD) and autism spectrum disorder (ASD) than adults without OCD.

In regards to the cause of onset, researchers asked participants in one study what they felt was responsible for triggering the initial onset of their illness. 29% of patients answered that there was an environmental factor in their life that did so. Specifically, the majority of participants who answered with that noted their environmental factor to be related to an increased responsibility.

Obsessions 

Obsessions are stress-inducing thoughts that recur and persist, despite efforts to ignore or confront them. People with OCD frequently perform tasks, or compulsions, to seek relief from obsession-related anxiety. Within and among individuals, initial obsessions vary in clarity and vividness. A relatively vague obsession could involve a general sense of disarray or tension, accompanied by a belief that life cannot proceed as normal while the imbalance remains. A more intense obsession could be a preoccupation with the thought or image of a close family member or friend dying, or intrusive thoughts related to relationship rightness. Other obsessions concern the possibility that someone or something other than oneself—such as God, the devil, or disease—will harm either the patient or the people or things the patient cares about. Others with OCD may experience the sensation of invisible protrusions emanating from their bodies, or feel that inanimate objects are ensouled.

Some people with OCD experience sexual obsessions that may involve intrusive thoughts or images of "kissing, touching, fondling, oral sex, anal sex, intercourse, incest, and rape" with "strangers, acquaintances, parents, children, family members, friends, coworkers, animals, and religious figures," and can include heterosexual or homosexual contact with people of any age. Similar to other intrusive thoughts or images, some disquieting sexual thoughts are normal at times, but people with OCD may attach extraordinary significance to such thoughts. For example, obsessive fears about sexual orientation can appear to the affected individual, and even to those around them, as a crisis of sexual identity. Furthermore, the doubt that accompanies OCD leads to uncertainty regarding whether one might act on the troubling thoughts, resulting in self-criticism or self-loathing.

Most people with OCD understand that their thoughts do not correspond with reality; however, they feel that they must act as though these ideas are correct or realistic. For example, someone who engages in compulsive hoarding might be inclined to treat inorganic matter as if it had the sentience or rights of living organisms, despite accepting that such behavior is irrational on an intellectual level. There is debate as to whether hoarding should be considered an independent syndrome from OCD.

Compulsions 

Some people with OCD perform compulsive rituals because they inexplicably feel that they must do so, while others act compulsively to mitigate the anxiety that stems from obsessive thoughts. The affected individual might feel that these actions will either prevent a dreaded event from occurring, or push the event from their thoughts. In any case, their reasoning is so idiosyncratic or distorted that it results in significant distress, either personally, or for those around the affected individual. Excessive skin picking, hair pulling, nail biting, and other body-focused repetitive behavior disorders are all on the obsessive–compulsive spectrum. Some individuals with OCD are aware that their behaviors are not rational, but they feel compelled to follow through with them to fend off feelings of panic or dread. Furthermore, compulsions often stem from memory distrust, a symptom of OCD characterized by insecurity in one's skills in perception, attention, and memory, even in cases where there is no clear evidence of a deficit.

Common compulsions may include hand washing, cleaning, checking things (such as locks on doors), repeating actions (such as repeatedly turning on and off switches), ordering items in a certain way, and requesting reassurance. Although some individuals perform actions repeatedly, they do not necessarily perform these actions compulsively; for example, morning or nighttime routines and religious practices are not usually compulsions. Whether behaviors qualify as compulsions or mere habit depends on the context in which they are performed. For instance, arranging and ordering books for eight hours a day would be expected of someone who works in a library, but this routine would seem abnormal in other situations. In other words, habits tend to bring efficiency to one's life, while compulsions tend to disrupt it. Furthermore, compulsions are different from tics (such as touching, tapping, rubbing, or blinking) and stereotyped movements (such as head banging, body rocking, or self-biting), which are usually not as complex and not precipitated by obsessions. It can sometimes be difficult to tell the difference between compulsions and complex tics, and about 10–40% of people with OCD also have a lifetime tic disorder.

People with OCD rely on compulsions as an escape from their obsessive thoughts; however, they are aware that relief is only temporary, and that intrusive thoughts will return. Some affected individuals use compulsions to avoid situations that may trigger obsessions. Compulsions may be actions directly related to the obsession, such as someone obsessed with contamination compulsively washing their hands, but they can be unrelated as well. In addition to experiencing the anxiety and fear that typically accompanies OCD, affected individuals may spend hours performing compulsions every day. In such situations, it can become difficult for the person to fulfill their work, familial, or social roles. These behaviors can also cause adverse physical symptoms; for example, people who obsessively wash their hands with antibacterial soap and hot water can make their skin red and raw with dermatitis.

Individuals with OCD often use rationalizations to explain their behavior; however, these rationalizations do not apply to the behavioral pattern, but to each individual occurrence. For example, someone compulsively checking the front door may argue that the time and stress associated with one check is less than the time and stress associated with being robbed, and checking is consequently the better option. This reasoning often occurs in a cyclical manner, and can continue for as long as the affected person needs it to in order to feel safe.

In cognitive behavioral therapy (CBT), OCD patients are asked to overcome intrusive thoughts by not indulging in any compulsions. They are taught that rituals keep OCD strong, while not performing them causes OCD to become weaker. This position is supported by the pattern of memory distrust; the more often compulsions are repeated, the more weakened memory trust becomes, and this cycle continues as memory distrust increases compulsion frequency. For body-focused repetitive behaviors (BFRB) such as trichotillomania (hair pulling), skin picking, and onychophagia (nail biting), behavioral interventions such as habit reversal training and decoupling are recommended for the treatment of compulsive behaviors.

OCD sometimes manifests without overt compulsions, which may be termed "primarily obsessional OCD." OCD without overt compulsions could, by one estimate, characterize as many as 50–60% of OCD cases.

Insight and overvalued ideation 
The Diagnostic and Statistical Manual of Mental Disorders (DSM-5), identifies a continuum for the level of insight in OCD, ranging from good insight (the least severe) to no insight (the most severe). Good or fair insight is characterized by the acknowledgment that obsessive–compulsive beliefs are not or may not be true, while poor insight, in the middle of the continuum, is characterized by the belief that obsessive–compulsive beliefs are probably true. The absence of insight altogether, in which the individual is completely convinced that their beliefs are true, is also identified as a delusional thought pattern, and occurs in about 4% of people with OCD. When cases of OCD with no insight become severe, affected individuals have an unshakable belief in the reality of their delusions, which can make their cases difficult to differentiate from psychotic disorders.

Some people with OCD exhibit what is known as overvalued ideas, ideas that are abnormal compared to affected individuals' respective cultures, and more treatment-resistant than most negative thoughts and obsessions. After some discussion, it is possible to convince the individual that their fears are unfounded. It may be more difficult to practice exposure and response prevention therapy (ERP) on such people, as they may be unwilling to cooperate, at least initially. Similar to how insight is identified on a continuum, obsessive-compulsive beliefs are characterized on a spectrum, ranging from obsessive doubt to delusional conviction. In the United States, overvalued ideation (OVI) is considered most akin to poor insight—especially when considering belief strength as one of an idea's key identifiers—but European qualifications have historically been broader. Furthermore, severe and frequent overvalued ideas are considered similar to idealized values, which are so rigidly held by, and so important to affected individuals, that they end up becoming a defining identity. In adolescent OCD patients, OVI is considered a severe symptom.

Historically, OVI has been thought to be linked to poorer treatment outcome in patients with OCD, but it is currently considered a poor indicator of prognosis. The Overvalued Ideas Scale (OVIS) has been developed as a reliable quantitative method of measuring levels of OVI in patients with OCD, and research has suggested that overvalued ideas are more stable for those with more extreme OVIS scores.

Cognitive performance 
Though OCD was once believed to be associated with above-average intelligence, this does not appear to necessarily be the case. A 2013 review reported that people with OCD may sometimes have mild but wide-ranging cognitive deficits, most significantly those affecting spatial memory and to a lesser extent with verbal memory, fluency, executive function, and processing speed, while auditory attention was not significantly affected. People with OCD show impairment in formulating an organizational strategy for coding information, set-shifting, and motor and cognitive inhibition.

Specific subtypes of symptom dimensions in OCD have been associated with specific cognitive deficits. For example, the results of one meta-analysis comparing washing and checking symptoms reported that washers outperformed checkers on eight out of ten cognitive tests. The symptom dimension of contamination and cleaning may be associated with higher scores on tests of inhibition and verbal memory.

Children 
Approximately 1–2% of children are affected by OCD. Obsessive–compulsive disorder symptoms tend to develop more frequently in children 10–14 years of age, with males displaying symptoms at an earlier age, and at a more severe level than females. In children, symptoms can be grouped into at least four types, including sporadic and tic-related OCD.

Associated conditions 
People with OCD may be diagnosed with other conditions as well, such as obsessive–compulsive personality disorder, major depressive disorder, bipolar disorder, generalized anxiety disorder, anorexia nervosa, social anxiety disorder, bulimia nervosa, Tourette syndrome, transformation obsession, ASD, ADHD, dermatillomania, body dysmorphic disorder, and trichotillomania. More than 50% of people with OCD experience suicidal tendencies, and 15% have attempted suicide. Depression, anxiety, and prior suicide attempts increase the risk of future suicide attempts.

It has been found that between 18 and 34% of females are currently experiencing or will experience OCD in their lifetime. Of that 18-34%, 7% are likely to have an eating disorder. Fewer than 5% of males have OCD and an eating disorder.

Individuals with OCD have also been found to be affected by delayed sleep phase disorder at a substantially higher rate than the general public. Moreover, severe OCD symptoms are consistently associated with greater sleep disturbance. Reduced total sleep time and sleep efficiency have been observed in people with OCD, with delayed sleep onset and offset.

Some research has demonstrated a link between drug addiction and OCD. For example, there is a higher risk of drug addiction among those with any anxiety disorder, likely as a way of coping with the heightened levels of anxiety. However, drug addiction among people with OCD may be a compulsive behavior. Depression is also extremely prevalent among people with OCD. One explanation for the high depression rate among OCD populations was posited by Mineka, Watson, and Clark (1998), who explained that people with OCD, or any other anxiety disorder, may feel "out of control".

Someone exhibiting OCD signs does not necessarily have OCD. Behaviors that present as obsessive–compulsive can also be found in a number of other conditions, including obsessive–compulsive personality disorder (OCPD), autism spectrum disorder (ASD), or disorders in which perseveration is a possible feature (ADHD, PTSD, bodily disorders, or stereotyped behaviors). Some cases of OCD present symptoms typically associated with Tourette syndrome, such as compulsions that may appear to resemble motor tics; this has been termed tic-related OCD or Tourettic OCD.

OCD frequently occurs comorbidly with both bipolar disorder and major depressive disorder. Between 60 and 80% of those with OCD experience a major depressive episode in their lifetime. Comorbidity rates have been reported at between 19 and 90%, as a result of methodological differences. Between 9–35% of those with bipolar disorder also have OCD, compared to 1–2% in the general population. About 50% of those with OCD experience cyclothymic traits or hypomanic episodes. OCD is also associated with anxiety disorders. Lifetime comorbidity for OCD has been reported at 22% for specific phobia, 18% for social anxiety disorder, 12% for panic disorder, and 30% for generalized anxiety disorder. The comorbidity rate for OCD and ADHD has been reported to be as high as 51%.

Causes 

The cause of OCD is unknown. Both environmental and genetic factors are believed to play a role. Risk factors include a history of Adverse Childhood Experiences or other stress-inducing events.

Drug-induced OCD 
Some medications and other drugs, such as methamphetamine or cocaine, can induce obsessive-compulsive disorder (OCD) in people without previous symptoms.

Some atypical antipsychotics (second-generation antipsychotics) such as olanzapine (Zyprexa) and clozapine (Clozaril) can induce OCD in people, particularly individuals with schizophrenia.

Genetics 
There appear to be some genetic components of OCD causation, with identical twins more often affected than fraternal twins. Furthermore, individuals with OCD are more likely to have first-degree family members exhibiting the same disorders than matched controls. In cases in which OCD develops during childhood, there is a much stronger familial link in the disorder than with cases in which OCD develops later in adulthood. In general, genetic factors account for 45–65% of the variability in OCD symptoms in children diagnosed with the disorder. A 2007 study found evidence supporting the possibility of a heritable risk for OCD.

Research has found there to be a genetic correlation between anorexia nervosa and OCD, suggesting a strong etiology. First and second hand relatives of probands with OCD have a greater risk of developing anorexia nervosa as genetic relatedness increases.

A mutation has been found in the human serotonin transporter gene hSERT in unrelated families with OCD.

A systematic review found that while neither allele was associated with OCD overall, in Caucasians, the L allele was associated with OCD. Another meta-analysis observed an increased risk in those with the homozygous S allele, but found the LS genotype to be inversely associated with OCD.

A genome-wide association study found OCD to be linked with single-nucleotide polymorphisms (SNPs) near BTBD3, and two SNPs in DLGAP1 in a trio-based analysis, but no SNP reached significance when analyzed with case-control data.

One meta-analysis found a small but significant association between a polymorphism in SLC1A1 and OCD.

The relationship between OCD and Catechol-O-methyltransferase (COMT) has been inconsistent, with one meta-analysis reporting a significant association, albeit only in men, and another meta analysis reporting no association.

It has been postulated by evolutionary psychologists that moderate versions of compulsive behavior may have had evolutionary advantages. Examples would be moderate constant checking of hygiene, the hearth, or the environment for enemies. Similarly, hoarding may have had evolutionary advantages. In this view, OCD may be the extreme statistical tail of such behaviors, possibly the result of a high number of predisposing genes.

Brain structure and functioning 
Imaging studies have shown differences in the frontal cortex and subcortical structures of the brain in patients with OCD. There appears to be a connection between the OCD symptoms and abnormalities in certain areas of the brain, but such a connection is not clear. Some people with OCD have areas of unusually high activity in their brain, or low levels of the chemical serotonin, which is a neurotransmitter that some nerve cells use to communicate with each other, and is thought to be involved in regulating many functions, influencing emotions, mood, memory, and sleep.

Autoimmune 
A controversial hypothesis is that some cases of rapid onset of OCD in children and adolescents may be caused by a syndrome connected to Group A streptococcal infections (GABHS), known as pediatric autoimmune neuropsychiatric disorders associated with streptococcal infections (PANDAS). OCD and tic disorders are hypothesized to arise in a subset of children as a result of a post-streptococcal autoimmune process. The PANDAS hypothesis is unconfirmed and unsupported by data, and two new categories have been proposed: PANS (pediatric acute-onset neuropsychiatric syndrome) and CANS (childhood acute neuropsychiatric syndrome). The CANS and PANS hypotheses include different possible mechanisms underlying acute-onset neuropsychiatric conditions, but do not exclude GABHS infections as a cause in a subset of individuals. PANDAS, PANS, and CANS are the focus of clinical and laboratory research, but remain unproven. Whether PANDAS is a distinct entity differing from other cases of tic disorders or OCD is debated.

A review of studies examining anti-basal ganglia antibodies in OCD found an increased risk of having anti-basal ganglia antibodies in those with OCD versus the general population.

Environment 
OCD may be more common in people who have been bullied, abused, or neglected, and it sometimes starts after a significant life event, such as childbirth or bereavement. It has been reported in some studies that there is a connection between childhood trauma and obsessive-compulsive symptoms. More research is needed to understand this relationship better.

Mechanisms

Neuroimaging 

Functional neuroimaging during symptom provocation has observed abnormal activity in the orbitofrontal cortex (OFC), left dorsolateral prefrontal cortex (dlPFC), right premotor cortex, left superior temporal gyrus, globus pallidus externus, hippocampus, and right uncus. Weaker foci of abnormal activity were found in the left caudate, posterior cingulate cortex, and superior parietal lobule. However, an older meta-analysis of functional neuroimaging in OCD reported that the only consistent functional neuroimaging finding was increased activity in the orbital gyrus and head of the caudate nucleus, while anterior cingulate cortex (ACC) activation abnormalities were too inconsistent.

A meta-analysis comparing affective and nonaffective tasks observed differences with controls in regions implicated in salience, habit, goal-directed behavior, self-referential thinking, and cognitive control. For nonaffective tasks, hyperactivity was observed in the insula, ACC, and head of the caudate/putamen, while hypoactivity was observed in the medial prefrontal cortex (mPFC) and posterior caudate. Affective tasks were observed to relate to increased activation in the precuneus and posterior cingulate cortex, while decreased activation was found in the pallidum, ventral anterior thalamus, and posterior caudate. The involvement of the cortico-striato-thalamo-cortical loop in OCD, as well as the high rates of comorbidity between OCD and ADHD, have led some to draw a link in their mechanism. Observed similarities include dysfunction of the anterior cingulate cortex and prefrontal cortex, as well as shared deficits in executive functions. The involvement of the orbitofrontal cortex and dorsolateral prefrontal cortex in OCD is shared with bipolar disorder, and may explain the high degree of comorbidity. Decreased volumes of the dorsolateral prefrontal cortex related to executive function has also been observed in OCD.

People with OCD evince increased grey matter volumes in bilateral lenticular nuclei, extending to the caudate nuclei, with decreased grey matter volumes in bilateral dorsal medial frontal/anterior cingulate gyri. These findings contrast with those in people with other anxiety disorders, who evince decreased (rather than increased) grey matter volumes in bilateral lenticular/caudate nuclei, as well as decreased grey matter volumes in bilateral dorsal medial frontal/anterior cingulate gyri. Increased white matter volume and decreased fractional anisotropy in anterior midline tracts has been observed in OCD, possibly indicating increased fiber crossings.

Cognitive models 

Generally, two categories of models for OCD have been postulated. The first category involves deficits in executive dysfunction and is based on the observed structural and functional abnormalities in the dlPFC, striatum and thalamus. The second category involves dysfunctional modulatory control and primarily relies on observed functional and structural differences in the ACC, mPFC, and OFC.

One proposed model suggests that dysfunction in the OFC leads to improper valuation of behaviors and decreased behavioral control, while the observed alterations in amygdala activations leads to exaggerated fears and representations of negative stimuli.

Due to the heterogeneity of OCD symptoms, studies differentiating various symptoms have been performed. Symptom-specific neuroimaging abnormalities include the hyperactivity of caudate and ACC in checking rituals, while finding increased activity of cortical and cerebellar regions in contamination-related symptoms. Neuroimaging differentiating content of intrusive thoughts has found differences between aggressive as opposed to taboo thoughts, finding increased connectivity of the amygdala, ventral striatum, and ventromedial prefrontal cortex in aggressive symptoms, while observing increased connectivity between the ventral striatum and insula in sexual or religious intrusive thoughts.

Another model proposes that affective dysregulation links excessive reliance on habit-based action selection with compulsions. This is supported by the observation that those with OCD demonstrate decreased activation of the ventral striatum when anticipating monetary reward, as well as increased functional connectivity between the VS and the OFC. Furthermore, those with OCD demonstrate reduced performance in Pavlovian fear-extinction tasks, hyperresponsiveness in the amygdala to fearful stimuli, and hyporesponsiveness in the amygdala when exposed to positively valanced stimuli. Stimulation of the nucleus accumbens has also been observed to effectively alleviate both obsessions and compulsions, supporting the role of affective dysregulation in generating both.

Neurobiological 

From the observation of the efficacy of antidepressants in OCD, a serotonin hypothesis of OCD has been formulated. Studies of peripheral markers of serotonin, as well as challenges with proserotonergic compounds have yielded inconsistent results, including evidence pointing towards basal hyperactivity of serotonergic systems. Serotonin receptor and transporter binding studies have yielded conflicting results, including higher and lower serotonin receptor 5-HT2A and serotonin transporter binding potentials that were normalized by treatment with SSRIs. Despite inconsistencies in the types of abnormalities found, evidence points towards dysfunction of serotonergic systems in OCD. Orbitofrontal cortex overactivity is attenuated in people who have successfully responded to SSRI medication, a result believed to be caused by increased stimulation of serotonin receptors 5-HT2A and 5-HT2C.

A complex relationship between dopamine and OCD has been observed. Although antipsychotics, which act by antagonizing dopamine receptors, may improve some cases of OCD, they frequently exacerbate others. Antipsychotics, in the low doses used to treat OCD, may actually increase the release of dopamine in the prefrontal cortex, through inhibiting autoreceptors. Further complicating things is the efficacy of amphetamines, decreased dopamine transporter activity observed in OCD, and low levels of D2 binding in the striatum. Furthermore, increased dopamine release in the nucleus accumbens after deep brain stimulation correlates with improvement in symptoms, pointing to reduced dopamine release in the striatum playing a role in generating symptoms.

Abnormalities in glutamatergic neurotransmission have implicated in OCD. Findings such as increased cerebrospinal glutamate, less consistent abnormalities observed in neuroimaging studies, and the efficacy of some glutamatergic drugs (such as the glutamate-inhibiting riluzole) have implicated glutamate in OCD. OCD has been associated with reduced N-Acetylaspartic acid in the mPFC, which is thought to reflect neuron density or functionality, although the exact interpretation has not been established.

Diagnosis 
 
Formal diagnosis may be performed by a psychologist, psychiatrist, clinical social worker, or other licensed mental health professional. OCD, like other mental and behavioral health disorders, cannot be diagnosed by a medical exam. Nor are there any medical exams that can predict if one will fall victim to such illnesses.To be diagnosed with OCD, a person must have obsessions, compulsions, or both, according to the Diagnostic and Statistical Manual of Mental Disorders (DSM). The DSM notes that there are multiple characteristics that can turn obsessions and compulsions from normalized behavior to "clinically significant". There has to be recurring and strong thoughts or impulsive that intrude on the day-to-day lives of the patients and cause noticeable levels of anxiousness.

These thoughts, impulses, or images are of a degree or type that lies outside the normal range of worries about conventional problems. A person may attempt to ignore or suppress such obsessions, or to neutralize them with some other thought or action, and will tend to recognize the obsessions as idiosyncratic or irrational.

Compulsions become clinically significant when a person feels driven to perform them in response to an obsession, or according to rules that must be applied rigidly, and when the person consequently feels or causes significant distress. Therefore, while many people who do not have OCD may perform actions often associated with OCD (such as ordering items in a pantry by height), the distinction with clinically significant OCD lies in the fact that the person with OCD must perform these actions to avoid significant psychological distress. These behaviors or mental acts are aimed at preventing or reducing distress or preventing some dreaded event or situation; however, these activities are not logically or practically connected to the issue, or, they are excessive. In addition, at some point during the course of the disorder, the individual must realize that his or her obsessions or compulsions are unreasonable or excessive.

Moreover, the obsessions or compulsions must be time-consuming, often taking up more than one hour per day, or cause impairment in social, occupational, or scholastic functioning. It is helpful to quantify the severity of symptoms and impairment before and during treatment for OCD. In addition to the person's estimate of the time spent each day harboring obsessive-compulsive thoughts or behaviors, concrete tools can be used to gauge the person's condition. This may be done with rating scales, such as the Yale–Brown Obsessive Compulsive Scale (Y-BOCS; expert rating) or the obsessive-compulsive inventory (OCI-R; self-rating). With measurements such as these, psychiatric consultation can be more appropriately determined, as it has been standardized.

In regards to diagnosing, the health professional also looks to make sure that the signs of obsessions and compulsions are not the results of any drugs, prescription or recreational, that the patient may be taking.

There are several types of obsessive thoughts that are found commonly in those with OCD. Some of these include fear of germs, hurting loved ones, embarrassment, neatness, societally unacceptable sexual thoughts etc. Within OCD, these specific categories are often diagnosed into their own type of OCD.

OCD is sometimes placed in a group of disorders called the obsessive–compulsive spectrum.

Another criterion in the DSM is that a person's mental illness does not fit one of the other categories of a mental disorder better. That is to say, if the obsessions and compulsions of a patient could be better described by trichotillomania, it would not be diagnosed as OCD. That being said, OCD does often go hand in hand with other mental disorders. For this reason, one may be diagnosed with multiple mental disorders at once or even multiple types of OCD at once.

A different aspect of the diagnoses is the degree of insight had by the individual in regards to the truth of the obsessions. There are three levels, good/fair, poor or absent/delusional. Good/fair indicated that the patient is aware that the obsessions they have are not true or probably not true. Poor indicates that the patient believes their obsessional beliefs are probably true. Absent/delusional indicates that they fully believe their obsessional thoughts to be true. Approximately 4% or fewer individuals with OCD will be diagnosed as absent/delusional. Additionally, as many as 30% of those with OCD also have a lifetime tic disorder, meaning they have been diagnosed with a tic disorder at some point in their life.

There are several different types of tics that have been observed in individuals with OCD. These include but are not limited to, "grunting", "jerking" or "shrugging" body parts, sniffling, and excessive blinking.

There has been a significant amount of progress over the last few decades, and as of 2022 there is statically significant improvement in the diagnostic process for individuals with OCD. One study found that of two groups of individuals, one with participants under the age of 27.25 and one with participants over that age, those in the younger group experienced a significantly faster time between the onset of OCD tendencies and their formal diagnoses.

Differential diagnosis 
OCD is often confused with the separate condition obsessive–compulsive personality disorder (OCPD). OCD is egodystonic, meaning that the disorder is incompatible with the individual's self-concept. As egodystonic disorders go against a person's self-concept, they tend to cause much distress. OCPD, on the other hand, is egosyntonic, marked by the person's acceptance that the characteristics and behaviors displayed as a result are compatible with their self-image, or are otherwise appropriate, correct, or reasonable.

As a result, people with OCD are often aware that their behavior is not rational, and are unhappy about their obsessions, but nevertheless feel compelled by them. By contrast, people with OCPD are not aware of anything abnormal; they will readily explain why their actions are rational. It is usually impossible to convince them otherwise, and they tend to derive pleasure from their obsessions or compulsions.

Management 
Cognitive behavioral therapy (CBT) and psychotropic medications are the first-line treatments for OCD.

Therapy 

The specific CBT technique used is called exposure and response prevention (ERP), which involves teaching the person to deliberately come into contact with situations that trigger obsessive thoughts and fears (exposure), without carrying out the usual compulsive acts associated with the obsession (response prevention). This technique causes patients to gradually learn to tolerate the discomfort and anxiety associated with not performing their compulsions. For many patients, ERP is the add-on treatment of choice when selective serotonin reuptake inhibitors (SSRIs) or serotonin-norepinephrine reuptake inhibitors (SNRIs) medication does not effectively treat OCD symptoms, or vice versa, for individuals who begin treatment with psychotherapy. Modalities differ in ERP treatment but both virtual reality based as well as unguided computer assisted treatment programs have shown effective results in treatment programs.

For example, a patient might be asked to touch something very mildly contaminated (exposure), and wash their hands only once afterward (response prevention). Another example might entail asking the patient to leave the house and check the lock only once (exposure), without going back to check again (response prevention). After succeeding at one stage of treatment, the patient's level of discomfort in the exposure phase can be increased. When this therapy is successful, the patient will quickly habituate to an anxiety-producing situation, discovering a considerable drop in anxiety level.

ERP has a strong evidence base, and is considered the most effective treatment for OCD. However, this claim was doubted by some researchers in 2000, who criticized the quality of many studies.

Acceptance and commitment therapy (ACT), a newer therapy also used to treat anxiety and depression, has also been found to be effective in treatment of OCD. ACT uses acceptance and mindfulness strategies to teach patients not to overreact to or avoid unpleasant thoughts and feelings but rather "move toward valued behavior."

A 2007 Cochrane review found that psychological interventions derived from CBT models, such as ERP and ACT, were more effective than non-CBT interventions. Other forms of psychotherapy, such as psychodynamics and psychoanalysis, may help in managing some aspects of the disorder. However, in 2007, the American Psychiatric Association (APA) noted a lack of controlled studies showing their efficacy, "in dealing with the core symptoms of OCD." For body-focused repetitive behaviors (BFRB), behavioral interventions such as habit-reversal training and decoupling are recommended.

Psychotherapy in combination with psychiatric medication may be more effective than either option alone for individuals with severe OCD. ERP coupled with weight restoration and serotonin reuptake inhibitors has proven the most effective when treating OCD and an eating disorder simultaneously.

Medication 

The medications most frequently used to treat OCD are antidepressants, including selective serotonin reuptake inhibitors (SSRIs) and serotonin-norepinephrine reuptake inhibitors (SNRIs). Sertraline and fluoxetine are effective in treating OCD for children and adolescents.

SSRIs help people with OCD by inhibiting the reabsorption of serotonin by the nerve cells after they carry messages from neurons to synapse; thus, more serotonin is available to pass further messages between nearby nerve cells.

SSRIs are a second-line treatment of adult OCD with mild functional impairment, and as first-line treatment for those with moderate or severe impairment. In children, SSRIs can be considered as a second-line therapy in those with moderate to severe impairment, with close monitoring for psychiatric adverse effects. Patients treated with SSRIs are about twice as likely to respond to treatment as are those treated with placebo, so this treatment is qualified as efficacious. Efficacy has been demonstrated both in short-term (6–24 weeks) treatment trials, and in discontinuation trials with durations of 28–52 weeks.

Clomipramine, a medication belonging to the class of tricyclic antidepressants, appears to work as well as SSRIs, but has a higher rate of side effects.

In 2006, the National Institute for Health and Care Excellence (NICE) guidelines recommended augmentative second-generation (atypical) antipsychotics for treatment-resistant OCD. Atypical antipsychotics are not useful when used alone, and no evidence supports the use of first-generation antipsychotics. For OCD treatment specifically, there is tentative evidence for risperidone, and insufficient evidence for olanzapine. Quetiapine is no better than placebo with regard to primary outcomes, but small effects were found in terms of Y-BOCS score. The efficacy of quetiapine and olanzapine are limited by an insufficient number of studies. A 2014 review article found two studies that indicated that aripiprazole was "effective in the short-term", and found that "[t]here was a small effect-size for risperidone or anti-psychotics in general in the short-term"; however, the study authors found "no evidence for the effectiveness of quetiapine or olanzapine in comparison to placebo." While quetiapine may be useful when used in addition to an SSRI/SNRI in treatment-resistant OCD, these drugs are often poorly tolerated, and have metabolic side effects that limit their use. A guideline by the American Psychological Association suggested that dextroamphetamine may be considered by itself after more well-supported treatments have been attempted.

Procedures 
Electroconvulsive therapy (ECT) has been found to have effectiveness in some severe and refractory cases. Transcranial magnetic stimulation has shown to provide therapeutic benefits in alleviating symptoms.

Surgery may be used as a last resort in people who do not improve with other treatments. In this procedure, a surgical lesion is made in an area of the brain (the cingulate cortex). In one study, 30% of participants benefitted significantly from this procedure. Deep brain stimulation and vagus nerve stimulation are possible surgical options that do not require destruction of brain tissue. In the United States, the Food and Drug Administration approved deep-brain stimulation for the treatment of OCD under a humanitarian device exemption, requiring that the procedure be performed only in a hospital with special qualifications to do so.

In the United States, psychosurgery for OCD is a treatment of last resort, and will not be performed until the person has failed several attempts at medication (at the full dosage) with augmentation, and many months of intensive cognitive–behavioral therapy with exposure and ritual/response prevention. Likewise, in the United Kingdom, psychosurgery cannot be performed unless a course of treatment from a suitably qualified cognitive–behavioral therapist has been carried out.

Children 
Therapeutic treatment may be effective in reducing ritual behaviors of OCD for children and adolescents. Similar to the treatment of adults with OCD, cognitive behavioral therapy stands as an effective and validated first line of treatment of OCD in children. Family involvement, in the form of behavioral observations and reports, is a key component to the success of such treatments. Parental interventions also provide positive reinforcement for a child who exhibits appropriate behaviors as alternatives to compulsive responses. In a recent meta-analysis of evidenced-based treatment of OCD in children, family-focused individual CBT was labeled as "probably efficacious," establishing it as one of the leading psychosocial treatments for youth with OCD. After one or two years of therapy, in which a child learns the nature of their obsession and acquires strategies for coping, they may acquire a larger circle of friends, exhibit less shyness, and become less self-critical.

Although the known causes of OCD in younger age groups range from brain abnormalities to psychological preoccupations, life stress such as bullying and traumatic familial deaths may also contribute to childhood cases of OCD, and acknowledging these stressors can play a role in treating the disorder.

Epidemiology 

Obsessive–compulsive disorder affects about 2.3% of people at some point in their life, with the yearly rate about 1.2%. OCD occurs worldwide. It is unusual for symptoms to begin after the age of 35 and half of people develop problems before 20. Males and females are affected about equally. However their is an earlier age for onset for males than females.

Prognosis 
Quality of life is reduced across all domains in OCD. While psychological or pharmacological treatment can lead to a reduction of OCD symptoms and an increase in reported quality of life, symptoms may persist at moderate levels even following adequate treatment courses, and completely symptom-free periods are uncommon. In pediatric OCD, around 40% still have the disorder in adulthood, and around 40% qualify for remission.

History 
Plutarch, an ancient Greek philosopher and historian, describes an ancient Roman man who possibly had scrupulosity, which could be a symptom of OCD or OCPD. This man is described as "turning pale under his crown of flowers," praying with a "faltering voice," and scattering "incense with trembling hands."

In the 7th century AD, John Climacus records an instance of a young monk plagued by constant and overwhelming "temptations to blasphemy" consulting an older monk, who told him: "My son, I take upon myself all the sins which these temptations have led you, or may lead you, to commit. All I require of you is that for the future you pay no attention to them whatsoever." The Cloud of Unknowing, a Christian mystical text from the late 14th century, recommends dealing with recurring obsessions by attempting to ignore them, and, if that fails, to "cower under them like a poor wretch and a coward overcome in battle, and reckon it to be a waste of your time for you to strive any longer against them", a technique now known as emotional flooding.

From the 14th to the 16th century in Europe, it was believed that people who experienced blasphemous, sexual or other obsessive thoughts were possessed by the devil. Based on this reasoning, treatment involved banishing the "evil" from the "possessed" person through exorcism. The vast majority of people who thought that they were possessed by the devil did not have hallucinations or other "spectacular symptoms" but "complained of anxiety, religious fears, and evil thoughts." In 1584, a woman from Kent, England, named Mrs. Davie, described by a justice of the peace as "a good wife", was nearly burned at the stake after she confessed that she experienced constant, unwanted urges to murder her family.

The English term obsessive–compulsive arose as a translation of German Zwangsvorstellung (obsession) used in the first conceptions of OCD by Karl Westphal. Westphal's description went on to influence Pierre Janet, who further documented features of OCD. In the early 1910s, Sigmund Freud attributed obsessive–compulsive behavior to unconscious conflicts that manifest as symptoms. Freud describes the clinical history of a typical case of "touching phobia" as starting in early childhood, when the person has a strong desire to touch an item. In response, the person develops an "external prohibition" against this type of touching. However, this "prohibition does not succeed in abolishing" the desire to touch; all it can do is repress the desire and "force it into the unconscious." Freudian psychoanalysis remained the dominant treatment for OCD until the mid-1980s, even though medicinal and therapeutic treatments were known and available, because it was widely thought that these treatments would be detrimental to the effectiveness of the psychotherapy. In the mid-1980s, this approach changed, and practitioners began treating OCD primarily with medicine and practical therapy rather than through psychoanalysis.

Notable cases 

John Bunyan (1628–1688), the author of The Pilgrim's Progress, displayed symptoms of OCD (which had not yet been named). During the most severe period of his condition, he would mutter the same phrase over and over again to himself while rocking back and forth. He later described his obsessions in his autobiography Grace Abounding to the Chief of Sinners, stating, "These things may seem ridiculous to others, even as ridiculous as they were in themselves, but to me they were the most tormenting cogitations." He wrote two pamphlets advising those with similar anxieties. In one of them, he warns against indulging in compulsions: "Have care of putting off your trouble of spirit in the wrong way: by promising to reform yourself and lead a new life, by your performances or duties".

British poet, essayist and lexicographer Samuel Johnson (1709–1784) also had OCD. He had elaborate rituals for crossing the thresholds of doorways, and repeatedly walked up and down staircases counting the steps. He would touch every post on the street as he walked past, only step in the middles of paving stones, and repeatedly perform tasks as though they had not been done properly the first time.

The American aviator and filmmaker Howard Hughes is known to have had OCD. Friends of Hughes have also mentioned his obsession with minor flaws in clothing. This was conveyed in The Aviator (2004), a film biography of Hughes.

English singer-songwriter George Ezra has openly spoken about his life-long struggle with OCD, particularly primarily obsessional obsessive–compulsive disorder (Pure O).

World renowned Swedish climate activist Greta Thunberg is also known to have OCD, among other mental health conditions.

American actor James Spader is also known to have OCD.

Society and culture

Art, entertainment and media
Movies and television shows may portray idealized or incomplete representations of disorders such as OCD. Compassionate and accurate literary and on-screen depictions may help counteract the potential stigma associated with an OCD diagnosis, and lead to increased public awareness, understanding and sympathy for such disorders.
 In the film As Good as It Gets (1997), actor Jack Nicholson portrays a man with OCD who performs ritualistic behaviors that disrupt his life.
 The film Matchstick Men (2003) portrays a con man named Roy (Nicolas Cage) with OCD who opens and closes doors three times while counting aloud before he can walk through them.
 In the television series Monk (2002–2009), the titular character Adrian Monk fears both human contact and dirt.
 In the novel Turtles All the Way Down (2017) by John Green, teenage main character Aza Holmes struggles with OCD that manifests as a fear of the human microbiome. Throughout the story, Aza repeatedly opens an unhealed callus on her finger to drain out what she believes are pathogens. The novel is based on Green's own experiences with OCD. He explained that Turtles All the Way Down is intended to show how "most people with chronic mental illnesses also live long, fulfilling lives".
 The British TV series Pure (2019) stars Charly Clive as a 24-year-old Marnie who is plagued by disturbing sexual thoughts, as a kind of primarily obsessional obsessive compulsive disorder.

Research 
The naturally occurring sugar inositol has been suggested as a treatment for OCD.

μ-Opioids, such as hydrocodone and tramadol, may improve OCD symptoms. Administration of opiate treatment may be contraindicated in individuals concurrently taking CYP2D6 inhibitors such as fluoxetine and paroxetine.

Much current research is devoted to the therapeutic potential of the agents that affect the release of the neurotransmitter glutamate or the binding to its receptors. These include riluzole, memantine, gabapentin, N-acetylcysteine, topiramate and lamotrigine.

Other animals

References

External links 

 
 National Institute Of Mental Health
 American Psychiatric Association
 APA Division 12 treatment page for obsessive-compulsive disorder
 

Anxiety disorders
Magical thinking
 
Ritual
Wikipedia neurology articles ready to translate
Wikipedia medicine articles ready to translate